Phebalium stenophyllum, commonly known as narrow-leaved phebalium,  is a species of small shrub that is endemic to south-eastern Australia. It has scaly branchlets, narrow oblong to more or less cylindrical leaves and yellow flowers in umbels of three to ten.

Description
The upper surface is glabrous on older leaves, the lower surface covered with silvery scales or obscured. Flowering occurs in spring.

Taxonomy
This species was first formally described as Phebalium squamulosum var. stenophyllum by George Bentham in Flora Australiensis in 1863. The type specimen was collected by botanist Ferdinand von Mueller in "the Grampian Mountains and desert of the Tattiara country towards the Murray river". It was subsequently published as a species in its own right by Joseph Maiden and Ernst Betche in A Census of New South Wales Plants in 1916.

Distribution and habitat
Narrow-leaved phebelium grows in eucalypt woodland, heath or mallee in disjunct populations in the central and southern tablelands of New South Wales and near the Victorian-South Australian border. It has also been recorded from Mt Zero and Mt Abrupt in the Grampians National Park and from near Blackwood.

Use in horticulture
Phebalium stenophyllum is cultivated as an ornamental flowering shrub. The species has some frost tolerance and performs best in a well-drained, partially shaded position. Established plants can withstand dry periods.

References

External links
Herbarium specimen at Royal Botanic Gardens Kew

stenophyllum
Flora of New South Wales
Flora of Victoria (Australia)
Flora of South Australia
Plants described in 1863
Taxa named by George Bentham